Publius Cornelius Scipio was an ancient Roman politician. Regarded as the first Scipio, his filiation, P. f M. n, mean that he is the son of a Publius, the son of a Marcus. He may have had the name “Maluginensis” in his name, making him possibly the son of Publius Cornelius Maluginensis, the Consular Tribune of 404 BC and the grandson of Marcus Cornelius Maluginensis, the Consul of 436 BC. He was the Magister Equitum of the dictator Marcus Furius Camillus in 396 BC, and served as Consular Tribune in 395 BC. He may have also served in 394 BC, as an unknown “Publius Cornelius” is known to have served. He had two children, Publius Cornelius Scipio, who was the Magister Equitum of the dictator Lucius Furius Camillus, probably the son of Marcus Furius Camillus, in 350 BC. His other son was Lucius Cornelius Scipio, who served as Consul in 350 BC. He is an ancestor to many Roman politicians, most notably Scipio Africanus.

External links 
 Consuls of the Roman Republic

Roman consular tribunes
Roman patricians
Maluginensis Scipio (consular tribune 395 BC)
4th-century BC Romans